Phaeodema is a genus of parasitic flies in the family Tachinidae.

Distribution
Argentina, Chile.

References

Monotypic Brachycera genera
Dexiinae
Tachinidae genera
Diptera of South America
Taxa named by John Merton Aldrich